Stars In Shorts is a 2012 compilation of seven movie-star-filled short films by various directors.

Plot
The seven shorts are:

See also
Shorts HD

References

External links 

2012 films
2012 short films
American anthology films
Compilation films
2010s English-language films